Devika Vaid is an Indian model and beauty queen. She was crowned Miss India Earth at Glamanand Supermodel India in the year 2018 and represented India at Miss Earth 2018 pageant held in Manila, Philippines.

Education and career
Vaid studied Bachelor of Commerce at Delhi University, where she developed an interest in fashion and modelling, the latter which she pursued in the second year of college. She is also a vlogger.

References

Living people
1992 births
Indian beauty pageant winners
People from Delhi